Une fille et des fusils is a 1965 French film directed by Claude Lelouch. It is also known in the English-speaking world as The Decadent Influence or To Be a Crook.

Plot
Four young people, tired of working life, decide that they can earn more money from crime than they can from work. The film follows their training at the first "crime school", as well as their following deeds.

Cast
Jean-Pierre Kalfon as Jean-Pierre
Amidou as Amidou
Pierre Barouh as Pierre
Jacques Portet as Jacques
Janine Magnan as Martine
Yane Barry as the bistrokeeper
Betty Beckers as the prostitute

Background
With the film becoming Lelouch's first commercial success, he attempted to destroy all copies and negatives of his previous films. Lelouche failed to find a distributor for his next film, Les grands moments, and he then destroyed that film as well.
Lelouch recycled some ideas from for Une fille et des fusils film in his later works, such as the shooting of bottles in Le bon et les méchants and the economic catastrophes in L'aventure, c'est l'aventure.

References

External links

1965 films
French crime comedy films
Films directed by Claude Lelouch
1960s French-language films
1960s French films